Novamute Records is the electronic dance music subsidiary of Mute Records, which was started in 1992. The label's staff included Mick Paterson (promotions), Pepe Jansz (A&R), and producer Seth Hodder, and it was originally set up to give UK releases to white label 12-inch singles and imports. In the United States it was distributed by Tommy Boy Records while the Mute parent label was distributed by Elektra Records.

In the beginning, the label licensed records and music from small labels such as Berlin-based Tresor and Canadian label Plus 8. It expanded its remit to include new work from artists such as Richie Hawtin and Luke Slater.

Novamute win the Best Label award at the Music und Maschine Awards in Germany in July 2002.

In 2017, Daniel Miller relaunched  the label with releases from Nicolas Bougaïeff  and Terence Fixmer.

Artists

 3 Phase
 ANNA
 Acid Casuals
 Aftrax
 Beyer and Lenk
 Charlotte de Witte
 Collabs 3000
 Compufonic
 Cristian Vogel
 Earnest Honest
 Emmanuel Top
 Hans Weekhout
 Indika
 Juno Reactor
 Karl Axel Bissler
 Luke Slater
 Meloboy
 Miss Kittin
 Needledust
 Nicolas Bougaïeff
 Phil Kieran
 Plastikman
 Richie Hawtin
 Si Begg
 S.I. Futures
 Soul Center
 Space DJz
 Speedy J
 Spirit Feel
 Terence Fixmer
 Tim Baker
 Tim Wright
 Totalis
 T.Raumschmiere
 Umek
 Unity 3
 Woody McBride

See also
 List of record labels

References

British record labels
Record labels established in 1992
Electronic music record labels
Mute Records